Meadview is an unincorporated community and census-designated place (CDP) in Mohave County, Arizona, United States, located near Lake Mead. As of the 2020 census, Meadview had 1,420 residents, up from 1,224 as of 2010. It was founded in the 1960s as a retirement community and is still largely one, as well as a vacation spot for people coming to enjoy Lake Mead.

Geography
From the road it is possible to see Lake Mead to the west,  distant.

Climate
According to the Köppen Climate Classification system, Meadview has a hot desert climate, abbreviated "BWk" on climate maps.

Demographics

According to the 2010 Census, the racial composition of Meadview was as follows:
 White: 92.8% (Non-Hispanic Whites: 95.5%; Hispanic Whites: 4.9%)
 Black or African American: 0.7%
 Asian: 1.0%
 Two or more races: 2.2%
 Native American: 1.3%
 Native Hawaiian and Other Pacific Islander: 0.1%

Source:

Media
Meadview is the community of license for five broadcast translator television stations and one translator radio station. The TV stations rebroadcast Phoenix stations, and are owned by Mohave County. The radio station is privately owned and rebroadcasts a radio station from Redding, California via satellite. Meadview is also within range of the major television and radio stations from Las Vegas, Nevada.

Broadcast media licensed to Meadview:
 K23DK – translator of KPNX 12 Phoenix (NBC)
 K25DH – translator of KTVK-TV 3 Phoenix (Ind)
 K36FZ – translator of KAET 8 Phoenix (PBS)
 K38GR – translator of KNXV-TV 15 Phoenix (ABC)
 K47HE – translator of KPHO-TV 5 Phoenix (CBS)
 K215DJ 90.9 – translator of KVIP-FM 98.1 Redding CA (Contemporary Christian)
 KCYE 107.9 – country station serving Las Vegas, licensed to Meadview.

References

External links
 

Census-designated places in Mohave County, Arizona
Census-designated places in Arizona
Unincorporated communities in Mohave County, Arizona
Populated places established in the 1960s
Unincorporated communities in Arizona
1960s establishments in Arizona